Okun peoples is the term generally used to describe groups of Yoruba communities in Kogi state, North-central Nigeria. Their dialects are generally classified in the Northeast Yoruba language (NEY) grouping. They are collectively called "Okun", which in the Yoruba language means 'vitality' or 'strength', and is the word commonly used in greeting among the people, although this form of greeting is also found among the Ekiti and Igbomina groups of Yoruba people. This identity, which was probably first suggested by Eva Kraft-Askari during a 1965 field expedition, has gained wide acceptance among the indigenous Yoruba people and scholars. The individual Okun subgroups share some historical and linguistic affinity but still maintain individual peculiarities. "Okun" therefore refers to the distinct, but culturally related Owé, Ìyàgbà, Ìjùmú, Gbẹdẹ, Bùnú or Abunu, Ikiri , Kabba and Òwòrò peoples, who together are said to make up 20% of the Kogi State population, according to the highly controversial 2006 National population census. It is also said that their indigenous food is Pounded yam, Of Which they share with Ekiti people.

History

The individual historical accounts that state that the Okun people migrated from Ile-Ife is very popular and highly accepted among the people. In the version of Yagba oral tradition for instance, the man who led a group of people to their present location was sent from Ile-Ife to establish the settlement but did not return over a long period of time to give an account of his expenditure. When he eventually returned and explained that he lost larger part of his acquired land to some other migrants, he was blamed for the loss. He responded thus in Yoruba, Ìyà àgbà ló jemí, the clause from which the name Iyagba or Yagba was coined.

Ade Obayemi however opined that the Okun people are aboriginals in the Niger-Benue confluence and may not have migrated to their present location from Ile-Ife. The turn of events that followed the Nupe military incursion of the 19th century left the Okun people as minorities in the Northern Region of Nigeria, separated from their relatives in the southwest.

Not much is known now about the Okun people even among other Yoruba subgroups. Furthermore, some still hold the opinion that they are not Yoruba. This opinion, however, cannot be correct since the Okun people speak obvious Yoruba dialects, can still trace their roots to Ile-Ife by oral traditions, and share similar cultural traits with the other Yoruba groups. These reasons and more have made historians like Ann O' Hear call attention to the need for further research on the Okun people and their history.

Archaeology
Archaeological evidence implies that the Okun people may be native to their territory and linked to the Proto-Yoruba group who lived to the west of the Niger River, contradicting the Ile Ife migration legends. At Ogidi-Ijumu, archaeological evidence from open sites and rock shelters revealed that the region had been inhabited since the Late Stone Age (LSA) of West Africa, circa 2000 BC. Potteries and microliths were discovered at the sites, indicating that Modern Humans may have lived there. Similar evidence, including artifacts from the Ceramic Stone Age, which dates to between 300 and 400 BC, was discovered in Iffe-Ijumu.

Geographical location and settlements
Okun land is located within longitude 5° 30' to 7°15' East and latitude 7°15' to 3°45'. They occupy the Niger-Benue confluence area along with the Southern Nupe, Kakanda, Ebira (Panda and Koto), Gbagyi and Igala. To the west of Okun land are the Igbomina and Ekiti Yoruba subgroups.

Historically, Okun people lived in small social-political units with unfixed political boundaries that allowed social, cultural and commercial interaction. Till date, villages of hundreds or a few thousand people are scattered all over Okun land. Okun people are spread across six local government areas in Kogi State, namely: Kabba-Bunu, Yagba-West, Yagba-East, Mopa-Muro, Ìjùmú and Lokoja local government Areas. Settlements include Mopa, Ogidi, Ayetoro Gbede, Okedayo, Odo Ere, Ife, Egbe, Iyara, Iyamoye, Odoape, Ekinrin-Adde, Kabba, Isanlu, Obajana, Ikoyi, Agbaja.

Language
Okun people speak varied Yoruba dialects such as Owé, Ìyàgbà, Ìjùmú, Bùnú and Ọwọrọ, which are mutually intelligible to a great extent. A large number of them speak Yoruba. Okun dialects have been influenced by languages like Igala, Nupe and Hausa, the most affected being Ọwọrọ. This influences are believed to be due to commercial and social interaction, shared boundary, and the 19th-century Nupe wars.

Culture 
The various Okun groups share similar dressing, cuisine, traditional religion, masquerading culture etc. The men practiced farming and hunting while the women took care of the home and raised the children. Crops cultivated included coffee, cocoa, yams, cassava, maize, sorghum, groundnuts, beans, and cotton. The Abunu women (and to a lesser extent, their Owe and Ọwọrọ neighbours) were known for the weaving and trade of Aso ipo, a red textile used in burial of the wealthy and making masquerade dresses. This textile was also an object of trade of the Abunu women to their Ebira neighbors and others.

The Okun people practice Christianity, Islam and traditional African religions. Although Okun people practice the worship of Orisa like Sango and Ogun and the consultation of Ifá (or Ihá) as the other larger Yoruba subgroups, prominence is given to the worship of ebora, believed to be spirits who live in forests, caves, mountains, stream or rivers. Okun people share similar masquerading culture and these masquerades (egungun or egun) are said to represent ancentral spirits. Although there are masquerades such as the Epa masquerade that are similar to those found among other Yoruba groups, Ina-oko, Onigabon, Ouna and the likes of other masquerades that are ubiquitous in Okun land are not found among the other Yoruba groups but rather found to be similar to those of some non-Okun inhabitants of the Niger-Benue confluence like the Bassa Nges. While the egungun cult groups are almost exclusive for men, women also had their own group called ofosi (ohosi in Oworo). Ofosi women spoke a language that was not intelligible locally and were believed to be able to call people home from whatever location by mystical means.

Until the advent of the Nupes in the 19th century, each of the Okun subgroups lacked any form of central government but were organised into small city states. Each 'state' was governed by leadership rotated amongst the constituent lineages or clans. The central kingship system has led to the establishment of royal stools such as Obaro of Kabba, Olubunu of Bunu, Olujumu of Ijumu, Agbana of Isanlu, Olu of Ọwọrọ. The Obaro of Kabba, Oba Michael Olobayo (Obaro Ero Il), is the chairman of the Okun traditional council.

In the early 20th century the Olu of Ọwọrọ (and head of Ọwọrọ district) was given supervisory role over non-Okun districts of Kakanda, Kupa and Eggan while the Obaro of Kabba had supervisory role over the other Okun people. Kabba which was used as the administrative and military base of the Nupe expedition, became the capital of the Kabba province of the Northern region and remains the largest and most important town of the Okun people. Despite the similarities pointed out above, there are yet identifiable differences in the culture of the various Okun subgroup. Some of these differences can be noticed in language, political arrangements, social institutions and the array of ebora (deities) worshipped.

Cuisine

The Okun people are known to have delicacies. Soups include ora soup (ground dried okra), akuku, and tankelekon soup. These are usually eaten with pounded yam. A popular snack is called adun (fried beans with palm oil and sugar).

Political struggle
Before the creation of Kogi state on 27 August 1991, Okun Yoruba people were in Kwara state alongside some of their Ekiti and the Igbomina neighbours. The perceived continual marginalization of the Okun people in Kogi state has made them to call for the creation of a state and proposed that it is made part of the southwest geopolitical zone of Nigeria, or alternatively, the excision of Okun dominated districts/communities from the present Kogi state and addition to a South Western state, with preference for Ekiti.

Notable people
 
 

 Pius Adesanmi
 Smart Adeyemi
 S. A. Ajayi
 Seth Sunday Ajayi
 Gbenro Ajibade
 Darey Art Alade
 Ibiyinka Alao
 Sammy Ameobi
 Shola Ameobi
 Tolulope Arotile
 Prof Dapo Folorunsho Asaju
 Sunday Awoniyi
 John Olatunde Ayeni
 Sunday Bada
 Yetunde Barnabas
 TY Bello
 Tunde Baiyewu
 Nike Davies-Okundaye
 Hon Abiodun Faleke
 Jaywon
 David Jemibewon
 Samuel Jemigbon
 Eyitayo Lambo
 Dino Melaye
 Prof Olufemi Obafemi
 John Obaro
 Tunde Ogbeha
 Bayo Ojo
 Jide Omokore
  Cardinal John Onaiyekan
 Juwon Oshaniwa
 WizzyPro
Etannibi Alemika
Joseph Abiodun Balogun

References

Further reading
Oyelaran O.O (1978), “Lingusitic Speculations on Yoruba History”, in his DEPARTMENT OF AFRICAN LANGUAGES AND LITERATURES, UNIVERSITY OF IFE SEMINAR SERIES 1:624-651. Ife-Department of African Languages and Literatures, University of Ife, Nigeria.
Bernhard Struck (1911)"Linguistic Bibliography of Northern Nigeria: Including Hausa and Fula, with Notes on the Yoruba Dialects" Journal of the Royal African Society.Vol. 11, No. 41 (Oct., 1911), pp. 47–61.Published by: Oxford University Press on behalf of Royal African Society.
Bakinde C.O.(2013) "Oral Narrations on the Origin and Settlement Patterns of Okun People of Central Nigeria". Journal of tourism and Heritage Studies. Vol 2 No.2
Temple O., Temple C. L. ( 1919 ) "Notes on the Tribes, Provinces, Emirates, and States of the Northern Provinces of Nigeria" . Printed by THE ARGUS PRINTING cK: PUBLISHING COMPANY, LIMITED. CAPE TOWN

 
Yoruba subgroups